Vergilov Ridge ('Vergilov Hrebet' \ver-'gi-lov 'hre-bet\) is a submarine ridge in South Bay, Livingston Island in the South Shetland Islands, Antarctica. It extends 3.5 km in a southeast-northwest direction between the Vergilov Rocks and the opposite Pimpirev Beach at a depth of over 50 m, with depths exceeding 100 m on both sides of the ridge. It was formed as a frontal moraine of Perunika Glacier between the 13th and 17th centuries.

The feature takes its name from the Vergilov Rocks.

Location
Spanish mapping in 1991.

See also
 Vergilov Rocks

Maps
 Isla Livingston: Península Hurd. Mapa topográfico de escala 1:25000. Madrid: Servicio Geográfico del Ejército, 1991. (Map reproduced on p. 16 of the linked work)
 L.L. Ivanov. Antarctica: Livingston Island and Greenwich, Robert, Snow and Smith Islands. Scale 1:120000 topographic map.  Troyan: Manfred Wörner Foundation, 2009.  
 Antarctica, South Shetland Islands, Livingston Island: Bulgarian Antarctic Base. Sheets 1 and 2. Scale 1:2000 topographic map. Geodesy, Cartography and Cadastre Agency, 2016. (in Bulgarian)
 Antarctic Digital Database (ADD). Scale 1:250000 topographic map of Antarctica. Scientific Committee on Antarctic Research (SCAR). Since 1993, regularly upgraded and updated.
 L.L. Ivanov. Antarctica: Livingston Island and Smith Island. Scale 1:100000 topographic map. Manfred Wörner Foundation, 2017.

References
 Vergilov Ridge. SCAR Composite Antarctic Gazetteer.
 Bulgarian Antarctic Gazetteer. Antarctic Place-names Commission. (details in Bulgarian, basic data in English)

External links
 Vergilov Ridge. Copernix satellite image

Ridges of Livingston Island
Bulgaria and the Antarctic